David William Bebbington  (born 25 July 1949) is a British historian who is a professor of history at the University of Stirling in Scotland and a distinguished visiting professor of history at Baylor University. He is a Fellow of the Royal Society of Edinburgh and the Royal Historical Society.

Biography
Bebbington was born in Nottingham, England, on 25 July 1949 and was raised in Sherwood, a northern suburb of Nottingham. An undergraduate at Jesus College, Cambridge (1968–1971), Bebbington began his doctoral studies there (1971–1973) before becoming a research fellow of Fitzwilliam College (1973–1976). Since 1976 he has taught at the University of Stirling, where since 1999 he has been Professor of History. 

He was President of the Ecclesiastical History Society (2006–2007).

Bebbington quadrilateral
Bebbington is widely known for his definition of evangelicalism, referred to as the Bebbington quadrilateral, which was first provided in his 1989 classic study Evangelicalism in Modern Britain: A History from the 1730s to the 1980s. Bebbington identifies four main qualities which are to be used in defining evangelical convictions and attitudes: 
 Biblicism: a particular regard for the Bible (e.g. all essential spiritual truth is to be found in its pages)
 Crucicentrism: a focus on the atoning work of Christ on the cross
 Conversionism: the belief that human beings need to be converted
 Activism: the belief that the gospel needs to be expressed in effort

Bebbington (along with Mark Noll and others) has exerted a large amount of effort in placing evangelicalism on the world map of religious history.  Through their efforts they have made it more difficult for scholars to ignore the influence of evangelicals in the world since the movement’s inception in the eighteenth century.

Works

Thesis

Books

References

Further reading

External links
David W. Bebbington's academic faculty page

1949 births
20th-century British historians
21st-century British historians
Academics of the University of Stirling
Alumni of Fitzwilliam College, Cambridge
Alumni of Jesus College, Cambridge
British Baptists
Fellows of Fitzwilliam College, Cambridge
Fellows of the Royal Historical Society
Fellows of the Royal Society of Edinburgh
Historians of Christianity
Living people
People from Nottingham
Presidents of the Ecclesiastical History Society